Ivan Alekseyevich Samarin (born 7 September 1988 in Moscow) is a Russian racing driver, holder of the honour of "Master of sports of Russia".

Career

Early career

Samarin competed in karting from 1998 to 2003. He began his formula racing career in the 2004 Formula RUS season, finishing fourth overall in the championship standings. For 2005, he remained in the series and finished as runner-up.

Samarin's next step was Formula 1600 Russia. The Russian driver took four race victories in 2006, en route to the championship. He continued in the series in 2007, taking the title once again.

In 2008, he took part in various local races of the Russian Formula Three, Finnish Formula Three, Formula Three NEZ championships.

He missed the entire 2009 season due to sponsorship problems.

FIA Formula Two Championship

Samarin stepped up to the FIA Formula Two Championship in 2010.

Racing record

Career results

Complete FIA Formula Two Championship results
(key) (Races in bold indicate pole position) (Races in italics indicate fastest lap)

References

External links
 

1988 births
Living people
Russian racing drivers
Russian Formula Three Championship drivers
French Formula Three Championship drivers
FIA Formula Two Championship drivers
German Formula Three Championship drivers
Sportspeople from Moscow